Jonathan "Jonny" Arriba Monroy (born 1 November 2001) is a Spanish professional footballer who plays as an attacking midfielder for Portuguese Primeira Liga club GD Chaves, on loan from Segunda División side Villarreal CF B.

Professional career
Arriba is a youth product of Vall de Uxó and Villarreal. He began his senior career with affiliate club Roda, appearing regularly before returning to Villarreal in 2021, being assigned to the C-team. He had a strong year with Villarreal C in 2021, with brief stints at Villarreal B. On 19 January 2022, he extended his contract with the club. Unable to break into the Villearreal B team, he joined the Portuguese club Chaves on loan for the 2022-23 season on 25 July 2022.

References

External links
 
 
 

2001 births
Living people
People from La Vall d'Uixó
Spanish footballers
Association football midfielders
Primera Federación players
Tercera División players
Tercera Federación players
Villarreal CF C players
Villarreal CF B players
Primeira Liga players
G.D. Chaves players
Spanish expatriate footballers
Expatriate footballers in Portugal
Spanish expatriate sportspeople in Portugal